Inga barbata is a species of tree in the family Fabaceae. It was described by English botanist George Bentham. It can be found in Peru and Brazil.

References

barbata
Trees of Peru
Trees of Brazil
Trees of South America